is a Japanese Nippon Professional Baseball pitcher for the Tohoku Rakuten Golden Eagles in Japan's Pacific League.

He attended Osaka Tōin High School and Josai University before being drafted by the Chiba Lotte Marines in the third round of the 1998 draft.

References

External links

NPB.com

Living people
1976 births
Baseball people from Osaka
Josai University alumni
Japanese baseball players
Nippon Professional Baseball pitchers
Chiba Lotte Marines players
Tohoku Rakuten Golden Eagles players